The Warburg family is a prominent German and American banking family of German Jewish and originally Venetian Jewish descent, noted for their varied accomplishments in biochemistry, botany, political activism, economics, investment banking, law, physics, classical music, art history, pharmacology, physiology, finance, private equity and philanthropy.

They are thought to have originated as the Venetian Jewish del Banco family, Anselmo and Abraham Ha Levi Kahana de Palenzuela from Spain, one of the wealthiest Sephardic German families in the early 16th century. Due to restrictions limiting Jewish involvement in banking, they moved to Bologna, and thence to Warburg, in Germany, in the 16th century, after which they later took their name. The first known ancestor was Simon von Kassel (1500 - 1566).

The family later established itself in Altona, near Hamburg in the 17th century, after the Thirty Years' War, and it was in Hamburg that M. M. Warburg & Co. was established in 1798, among the oldest still existing investment banks in the world. Other banks created by members of the family include M.M.Warburg & Co.; Warburg Pincus; and S. G. Warburg & Co., renamed UBS Warburg in 1995, following its acquisition by UBS.

Family organization

Alsterufer and Mittelweg lines
The family is traditionally divided into two prominent lines, the Alsterufer Warburgs and the Mittelweg Warburgs. The Alsterufer Warburgs descended from Siegmund Warburg (1835–1889) and the Mittelweg Warburgs descended from his brother Moritz M. Warburg (1838–1910). They took their nicknames from the brothers' respective addresses in Hamburg's Rotherbaum neighborhood. The brothers were grandsons of Moses Marcus Warburg.

Siegmund George Warburg was of the Alsterufer lines; the five brothers Abraham (Aby) M., Max M., Paul M., Felix M. and Fritz Moritz Warburg were of the Mittelweg line.

The brothers Moses Marcus Warburg (1763–1830) and Gerson Warburg (1765–1826) founded the M. M. Warburg & Co. banking company in 1798. Moses Warburg's great-great grandson, Siegmund George Warburg, founded the investment bank S. G. Warburg & Co in London in 1946. Siegmund's second cousin, Eric Warburg, founded Warburg Pincus in New York in 1938. Eric Warburg's son Max Warburg Jr. (not to be confused with Eric's father Max Warburg) is currently one of the three partners of M.M.Warburg & Co., Warburg. Max Warburg's elder brother Aby Warburg used family resources to establish the Kulturwissenschaftliche Bibliothek Warburg in Hamburg, since 1934 The Warburg Institute in London. Paul Warburg is most famous as an architect of the US Federal Reserve System, established in 1913. Paul was a member of the first Federal Reserve Board, and its Vice Chairman until his resignation in August 1918.

American and German Warburgs

Felix and Paul Warburg emigrated to the United States. There they became the two mainstays of the German-American branch, out of the five German born Warburg brothers. The brothers worked out of New York City where nearly all the male members formed a close bond with the Kuhn, Loeb & Co. investment banking firm. An American based, but internationally sound firm which at one time toyed with creating a branch abroad that was presumed would operate most efficiently with the aid of the families international connections. While in NYC, Felix Warburg married Frieda Schiff, only daughter of Jacob H. Schiff, a banker who grew up in Frankfurt and had ties to the German Warburgs. Schiff financed most of the American rail system through his investment bank of Kuhn, Loeb & Co. and interacted with newly American Warburgs, as brothers Felix and Paul each eventually made senior partner for, and each married into some of the  prominent families with the investment banking firm of Kuhn, Loeb & Co., at the time, run by Schiff. Beginning with the marriage of Jacob Schiff in 1875 to Therese Loeb, a daughter of co-founder Solomon Loeb, becoming a full partner in the business firm shortly after. In 1895, Paul Warburg married Nina Loeb, daughter of Solomon Loeb of Kuhn, Loeb & Co.,having met her at the wedding of brother Felix Warburg who had married Jacob Schiff's daughter, Frieda. But, originally it was founding partner Abraham Kuhn who concentrated the family wealth and cemented business relations with newly immigrated distant cousin, Solomon Loeb, by his marriage to Kuhn's sister. Shortly thereafter the two became full partners in their newly established New York banking investment firm of, Kuhn, Loeb & Co. 
In more recent times Schiff's great-great grandson Drew, previously was married to Al Gore's daughter, Karenna, who has risen in place at the Union Theological Seminary. UTS shares a partnership with the Jewish Theological Seminary, each located in NYC in Manhattan, where the JTS has historically been associated as well, with the Jewish Museum. Having ties to America and Germany like many other prominent Jewish financial families, the Warburgs abroad maintained close ties to their Jewish roots. The Felix M. Warburg House in New York City is now the Jewish Museum, and Kfar Warburg in Israel is named for him. Otto Warburg, a cousin of the German-based Warburgs was a wealthy botanist who was elected head of the World Zionist Organization in 1911. Felix's brother, Paul Warburg was one of the original founders of the board of the U.S. Federal Reserve System, a collection of 12 regional Reserve Banks headed by a Board of Governors which regulates and oversees private commercial banks. As one of the most prominent bankers of his time, his brother Max Warburg attended the Paris Peace Conference of 1919 at Versailles, as part of the German delegation.

During the Weimar Republic, Max Warburg served on the board ('Generalrat') of the Reichsbank from 1924 to 1933, under two successive chairmen, Hjalmar Schacht, (until 1930), and Hans Luther (1930-1933); until 1934, he was also on the Board of the Bankenverband.  Max Warburg emigrated in 1938. In the 1920s and 1930s, until the end of the Weimar Republic in 1933,  Max Warburg also served on several Supervisory Boards ("Aufsichtsrat") in industry, notably HAPAG, Blohm &Voss, Beiersdorf, and, until his resignation in 1932, as a member of the Supervisory Board ("Aufsichtsrat")  of the German conglomerate/ chemical firm known as I.G. Farben (Interessen Gemeinschaft Farben). His brother Paul Warburg, who died in January 1932a year before Hitler was elected Chancelloralso served on numerous Supervisory Boards ("Aufsichtsrat") including allegedly that of an I.G. Farben wholly owned US subsidiary.

Most members of the German Warburg family had fled to the United States or Great Britain by the end of 1938. However, Max Warburg's brother, Fritz Warburg, who was preparing his exile in Sweden, was arrested by the Gestapo in Hamburg in early November 1938 and spent some months in prison before he could leave for Stockholm in May 1939.  His daughter Eva came to organize the emigration for 500 German Jewish children from Germany and Austria to Sweden in 1938 and 1939. Also, three cousins, mother, Gerta and  daughters Betty and Helene Julie (Burchard) Warburg, stayed in Altona. Gerta and Betty were murdered in the Sobibor extermination camp in 1940 and Helena Julie in Auschwitz in 1942. A life size portrait of Helene Julie by the Norwegian artist Edvard Munch today hangs in the Kunsthaus in Zurich (The Lady in White). Eric Warburg, son of Max Warburg, returned to Germany as an officer (colonel) in the American Air Force and was influential in restoring German-Jewish relations and rebuilding Germany's economic ties after the Second World War through his international business associations. Eric's son, also called Max, is currently a partner in M.M. Warburg & Co. in Hamburg.

Venetian origins
The Warburg family is thought to have originated from  Venice, at which point they bore the surname del-Banco. The historical documents describe Anselmo del Banco as Jewish and as having been one of the wealthiest residents of Venice in the early 16th century. In 1513, del Banco was granted a charter by the Venetian government permitting the lending of money with interest. Del Banco left with his family after new restrictions were placed upon the Jewish community coinciding with the establishment of the Venetian Ghetto. The family settled in Bologna, and from there to the German town of Warburg, and adopted that town's name as their own surname, after having moved to Hamburg after the Thirty Years' War.

Noteworthy members

 Moses Marcus Warburg (1763–1830), founder, with his brother Gerson Warburg (1765–1825), of M. M. Warburg & Co. in 1798.
  Sara Warburg (1805–1884) married to Abraham Samuel Warburg (1798–1856), her cousin
Rosa Warburg (1833–1908), married to Paul Schiff, director of the Creditanstalt of Vienna
Siegmund Warburg (1835–1889), married to Théophilie Rosenberg
Abraham Samuel Warburg (1864–1933)
 Georg Gabriel Warburg (1871–1923)
 Siegmund George Warburg (1902–1982), founder of S. G. Warburg & Co, London
 Moritz M. Warburg (1838–1910), married to Charlotte Oppenheim
Abraham M. Warburg (1866–1929), German art historian
Max M. Warburg (1867–1946), banker
 Eric M. Warburg (1900–1990), founder of Warburg Pincus, married to Dorothea Thorsch (1912–2003)
Max M. Warburg jr. (b.1948)
 Marie Warburg, married to Michael Naumann (b.1941), journalist
Paul M. Warburg (1868–1932), father of the Federal Reserve, married Nina Loeb (1863–1912) in 1895, the daughter of Solomon Loeb
 James Warburg (1897–1969), economist, banker, advisor to Franklin D. Roosevelt, married to Kay Swift (1897–1993)
 Andrea Swift Warburg, married to Sidney Kaufman.
 Katharine Kaufman Weber (b.1955), novelist, married to Nicholas Fox Weber.
 Bettina Warburg (1900-1990) psychiatrist.
Katharine Warburg (1870–1935), married to Isaac Dorfman (1868–1929), philanthropist, banker.
Felix M. Warburg (1871–1937), New York banker with Kuhn, Loeb & Co., philanthropist, married Frieda Schiff (1876–1958), daughter of Jacob H. Schiff and granddaughter of Solomon Loeb in 1895.
 Carola Warburg Rothschild (1896–1987), married to Walter N. Rothschild, son of Simon F. Rothschild
Walter N. Rothschild Jr.
Phyllis Rothschild Peters Farley 
Carol Rothschild Bradford Noyes, married Amory Howe Bradford (d. 1998), son of Arthur Howe Bradford; married 1965 to diplomat Charles P. Noyes
David A. Bradford
Carola Bradford Lea
Madhavi Bradford
Deborah Bradford
Peter A. Bradford, married Katherine Bradford
Arthur Bradford
Laura Rothschild Bradford Kirkpatrick
Frederick Marcus Warburg (1897–1973), married to Wilma L. Shannon
 Gerald Felix Warburg (c.1902–1971), well-known cellist and conductor, married Natica Nast (1905–1987), daughter of Condé Nast
 Paul Felix Warburg (c.1904–1965)
 Edward Warburg (1908–1992), philanthropist and benefactor of the arts, married to Mary Warburg (1908–2009)
 David Warburg
 Ian Warburg, married to Jane Green (1968–) author, philanthropist.
 Daphne Warburg (b. 1949), married to Michael Ramon Langhorne Astor, eldest son of Jakie Astor.
Olga Warburg (1872–1895)
Fritz M. Warburg (1879–1962) living in Stockholm during World War I and II, father of Eva Warburg who organized Kindertransport to Sweden in 1938 and -39.
 Louisa Warburg (1879–1973), married to Julius Derenberg (1873–1928)
 Walter Julius Derenberg (1903–1975), legal scholar

Relatives
 Emil Warburg, (1846–1931), German physicist
 Otto Heinrich Warburg (1883–1970), physiologist and biochemist (Nobel prize in Medicine, 1931)
 Otto Warburg (1859–1938), botanist and president of the World Zionist Organization

See also

M. M. Warburg & Co.
Warburg Pincus
S. G. Warburg & Co.
Kuhn, Loeb & Co.
Warburg Institute
Rothschild family

References

Further reading

 

Rudberg, Pontus (2017). The Swedish Jews and the Holocaust. Abingdon & New York: Routledge. .

External links
  
Irving Katz's review of The Warburgs: The Twentieth-Century Odyssey of a Remarkable Jewish Family by Ron Chernow

 
American people of German-Jewish descent
Banking families
Business families of the United States
German bankers
History of banking
History of the Federal Reserve System
History of private equity and venture capital
Jewish-American families
Jewish American philanthropists
Jewish-German families
UBS